Hopeton (formerly Forlorn Hope and, later, Hopetown) is an unincorporated community in Merced County, California.

The first name of the place was Forlorn Hope, after a battle term. The Forlorn post office operated from 1854 to 1859, and from 1860 to 1861. The Hopeton post office operated from 1866 to 1894 and from 1911 to 1914.

References

Unincorporated communities in California
Unincorporated communities in Merced County, California
1854 establishments in California